The Speaker of the Western Australian Legislative Assembly is the presiding officer in the Legislative Assembly. The office has existed since the creation of the Legislative Assembly in 1890 under the Constitution Act 1889. The 31st and current Speaker is Labor MLA Michelle Roberts, who has held the role since the 2021 state election.

The role of the Speaker
The Speaker is elected to the position by a ballot of the members of the Legislative Assembly from among its members after being nominated by the Premier of Western Australia. It is generally a partisan position; the governing party almost always installs one of its members in the position. As with the other states and territories, the Speaker continues to attend party meetings and stands at general elections as a party candidate, if they are indeed a member of a party. There is no convention that the Speaker should be unopposed for reelection.

On the other hand, the Speaker is not a political figure like those in the United States. The Speaker does not take part in debates in the House, does not vote in the House except in the (rare) event of a tied vote, and does not speak in public on party-political issues (except at election time in his or her own constituency).

The Speaker's principal duty is to preside over the Assembly. The occupant of the Chair must maintain order in the House, uphold the Standing Orders (rules of procedure) and protect the rights of backbench members. The Speaker is expected to conduct the business of the House in an impartial manner, and generally does so. The Speaker is assisted by a member-elected Deputy Speaker, who is usually also of the governing party.

List of speakers of the Western Australian Legislative Assembly

 Members of the Legislative Assembly were not officially associated with organised parties until 1904.

See also

 President of the Western Australian Legislative Council

References
 
 Speaker of the Legislative Assembly

Western Australia